Joseph Saunders may refer to:
Joseph Saunders (chief executive), executive chairman and former CEO of Visa Inc.
Joseph Saunders (engraver), engraver, illustrator, publisher and professor of fine art
Joe Saunders, American baseball pitcher
Joe Saunders (politician), member of the Florida House of Representatives